Reji Nair (born 7 October 1976) is an Indian film director and screenwriter, who works in the Malayalam film industry. He debuted in 2003 with the film Pattalam written by him.

Career 
After debuting with Pattalam in 2003, he scripted for Oruvan which Prithviraj and Indrajith acted in leading roles. Subsequently he becomes an independent director in Kalikalam in which all time great Sharada  is in center character. He becomes a producer for his fourth  project Aram which he directed and scripted. Moreover as a journalist he entered into the Limca Book of Records by his innovative ideas in media. Reji becomes a producer for his fourth project Aram in his own banner  ‘Focus Films’.

Filmography

References

External links 
 

Malayalam film directors
Living people
Film directors from Kerala
Malayalam screenwriters
1976 births
Artists from Kozhikode
Screenwriters from Kerala
Indian film directors